The Maritime and Port Authority of Brunei Darussalam (MPABD) is a statutory board under the Ministry of Transport of the Government of Brunei. The agency was formed by Maritime and Port Authority of Brunei Darussalam Order, 2017.

Role 
As Port Authority, MPABD regulates and manages port and marine services, facilities and activities within the Brunei waters. This includes vessel traffic and navigational safety and security, through regulation on operational efficiency and on the environment.

As Developer and Promoter, MPABD works with other government agencies and maritime industry partners to make Brunei a leading global hub port and a top international maritime center. Its aims include attracting a core group of shipowners and operators to set up operations in Brunei, broadening the breadth and depth of maritime ancillary services offered here, and improving on the business environment for the maritime industry.

As the National Sea Transport Representative, the MPABD safeguards Brunei's maritime/port interests in the international arena. This extends to being the Government's Advisor on matters relating to sea transport, and maritime/port services and facilities.

References 

Port authorities

External links 

 Official website

Government agencies of Brunei
Government of Brunei